Edith Flack Ackley Wengenroth (6 June 1887 – 28 November 1970) was an American writer and doll maker and designer.

Bio
She was born in Greenport, New York. She made her first dolls for her daughter. When her daughter, Telka, was older she did water color paintings that were portraits of Ackley's dolls. Ackley went on to make dolls as a source of income, and had her own doll shop. Ackley's dolls have been shown in the Wenham Museum and the Children's Museum of Cleveland.

Books

Personal life 
Her first husband, Floyd Ackley, was a jewelry designer. Her second husband was the artist Stow Wengenroth, whom she married in 1936.

References

External links
 , May 29, 2020

American women writers
Dollmakers
1887 births
1970 deaths